Middleton Hall is a Grade II* listed building dating back to medieval times. It is situated in the North Warwickshire district of the county of Warwickshire in England, south of Fazeley and Tamworth and on the opposite side of the A4091 road to Middleton village.

The Manor of Middleton was held by the Freville family until 1418 and came to the Willoughbys by virtue of the marriage of the heiress Margaret de Freville to Sir Hugh Willoughby. The Willoughbys already had extensive estates in Nottinghamshire and elsewhere, their principal seat being Wollaton Hall, Nottingham.

In the mid-17th century the hall was the home of Francis Willughby, the mathematician and naturalist, and passed ti his descendants the Middleton barons. The hall was also for a time the home of the parson-naturalist John Ray. The Georgian west wing dates from the late 18th century.  In 1812 the estates and the barony passed to Henry Willoughby of the Birdsall, Yorkshire branch of the family and Middleton declined in importance in family terms. The Middleton and Wollaton estates were sold in the 1920s.

The hall was allowed to fall into disrepair over many years and since 1980 has been restored by a charitable trust. Much work has been done on the main hall, walled garden, Tudor barn complex (now craft shops) and a 16th-century jettied building, which was close to collapse before restoration commenced. The stables and lodging block are on Historic England's Heritage at Risk Register due their  poor condition.

The surrounding 40 acres (160,000 m²) of land include two walled gardens, the largest man-made lake in Warwickshire, much woodland and Middleton Lakes RSPB reserve.

References

External links

 Middleton Hall Trust

Grade II* listed buildings in Warwickshire
Country houses in Warwickshire
Gardens in Warwickshire
Borough of North Warwickshire